Formosa Island is an island in the River Thames in England at Cookham Lock near Cookham, Berkshire, with two smaller adjacent islands.

It can be reached by footbridge from Cookham. It is between two of the four channels in the river at Cookham, the one closest to Cookham was once the mill stream to a paper mill at Cookham. The one on the other side leads to Odney Weir. The adjacent Mill Island has the lock channel on the other side. Beyond the lock channel is Sashes Island and the channel furthest from Cookham is Hedsor Water, the original navigation channel, which was blocked by the weir in 1830 when the lock was opened, causing loss of trade to then owner Lord Boston.

See also
Islands in the River Thames

References

Islands of Berkshire
Islands of the River Thames
Cookham